Karunadasa Kodithuwakku (born 15 June 1961) is a Sri Lankan politician and Member of Parliament.

Kodithuwakku was born on 15 June 1961. He was educated at Horagoda Maha Vidyalaya. He is a businessman.

Kodithuwakku contested the 2020 parliamentary election as a Sri Lanka People's Freedom Alliance electoral alliance candidate in Matara District and was elected to the Parliament of Sri Lanka.

References

1961 births
Living people
Members of the 16th Parliament of Sri Lanka
Sinhalese businesspeople
Sinhalese politicians
Sri Lankan Buddhists
Sri Lanka People's Freedom Alliance politicians
Sri Lanka Podujana Peramuna politicians